Tennai Rosharne Watson (born 4 March 1997) is an English professional footballer who plays as a wing-back for  club Milton Keynes Dons.

Career

Reading
Watson joined the academy of Reading at a young age, and progressed through the ranks to eventually sign professional terms with the club in May 2016. He made his first team debut on 6 August 2016, coming on as a 66th-minute substitute for the injured Jordan Obita. 

On 1 February 2018, Watson signed a contract extension with Reading until the summer 2021, and was later sent out on loan for the 2018–19 and 2019–20 seasons to League One clubs AFC Wimbledon and Coventry City. However, at the end of the 2020–21 season, he was one of four Reading players released by the club.

Milton Keynes Dons
On 28 July 2021, Watson signed for the League One club Milton Keynes Dons after a successful trial period, having been recommended to the club by his former Reading teammate, Zak Jules. He made his league debut for the club on 7 August 2021, in a 3–3 draw away to Bolton Wanderers. On 8 December 2021, Watson scored his first career professional goal in a 1–1 draw at home to Plymouth Argyle.

Career statistics

References

External links

Living people
1997 births
Footballers from the London Borough of Hillingdon
English footballers
Association football defenders
Reading F.C. players
Coventry City F.C. players
AFC Wimbledon players
Milton Keynes Dons F.C. players
English Football League players